Arsh Muneer was a Pakistani actress and singer who acted in television dramas. She played roles in the dramas Khuda Ki Basti, Shama, Shehzori, Zair, Zabar, Pesh, Intezar Farmaiye and Ana.

Early life
Arsh was born in 1914 in Lucknow, British India. She migrated to Pakistan in Karachi with her family. Later she completed her studies from the University of Karachi. She started working at Radio Pakistan in Lahore in 1947 after migrating to Pakistan. She also did stage shows and theatre plays.

Career
While she was in India she started working at All India Radio in Delhi. She made her debut as an actress on PTV in 1964. She performed in dramas Zair, Zabar, Pesh, Jaidi and Eid Ka Jora. She also appeared in dramas Oh, Maaf Kijiye, Intezar Farmaiye, Kya Bane Baat and Fanooni Lateefay. She worked at Radio Pakistan for 30 years. She also appeared in movie Insan Badalta Hay. She also sanged songs for Radio, dramas and films. Since then she appeared in dramas Ana, Ba Adab Ba Mulahiza Hoshiyar and Shehzori. For her contributions towards the television industry, she was honored by the Government of Pakistan with the Pride of Performance in 1983. In 2005, Tributes were paid to her at the 1st Indus Drama Awards in Karachi by television personalities Moin Akhter, Babra Sharif, Faysal Qureshi, Humayun Saeed, Sultana Siddiqui and Adnan Siddiqui.

Personal life
Arsh was married and had five children.

Death
She died on 8 September 1998 in Karachi and was buried at Sakhi Hassan Graveyard.

Filmography

Television

Telefilm

Film

Awards and recognition

References

External links
 

1914 births
20th-century Pakistani actresses
20th-century Pakistani women singers
Actresses from Karachi
Pakistani film actresses
Singers from Lahore
Pakistani stage actresses
Punjabi-language singers
1998 deaths
Hindi-language singers
Pakistani television actresses
Pakistani women singers
People from Karachi
Urdu-language singers
PTV Award winners
Muhajir people
Recipients of the Pride of Performance
Radio personalities from Lahore
Actresses in Urdu cinema